Bandon A.F.C. is an Irish football club currently playing in the Munster Senior League.

The club also have teams in the Cork Schoolboy League, Cork Woman's and Schoolgirl League and Cork Youth League.

History
Football in Bandon began at the turn of the 20th century. However, it was around 1950 that a team was entered into a league. They were entered into the AUL Division 3. The club known as Bandon AFC lasted from 1950 to 1955. Between 1955 and 1970, soccer was non-existent in the town.

In 1970, there was a resurrection of Bandon AFC. This was organized by three men, Con Waugh, Donal Crowley and Tom Griffin. They organised a public meeting and a committee was put together which decided to enter a team in the Cork AUL and the club would again be known as Bandon AFC.

Honours
Munster Senior League
Division 1 - Winners 2014/15
Division 1 - Runners-up 2012/13
Division 2 - Runners-up 2010/11

See full list of club honours here

External links
Official website
Munster Senior Leagues website
Cork Schoolboys Leagues website
Cork Womans and Schoolgirls Leagues website
Cork Youth Leagues website

Association football clubs in County Cork
Bandon, County Cork
1970 establishments in Ireland
Munster Senior League (association football) clubs
Former Cork Athletic Union League clubs
Association football clubs established in 1970